Dendronetria is a genus of Indonesian dwarf spiders that was first described by Alfred Frank Millidge & A. Russell-Smith in 1992. , it contained only two species, both found in Borneo: D. humilis and D. obscura.

See also
 List of Linyphiidae species

References

Araneomorphae genera
Linyphiidae
Spiders of Asia